A dragée, also known as a confetto or malbas, is a bite-sized form of confectionery with a hard outer shell. It is often used for another purpose (e.g. decorative, symbolic, medicinal, etc.) in addition to consumption.

Use

Jordan almonds 

In their most classic form of dragée and comfit, Jordan almonds, also known as koufeta, consist of almonds which are sugar panned in various pastel colors.

Jordan almonds are often used as wedding favors—like the Italian bomboniere—with the "bitter" almonds and the "sweet" sugar symbolizing the bitterness of life and sweetness of love. The treats are often packaged in groups of five to represent happiness, health, longevity, wealth, and fertility.  At Italian and Greek weddings, the almonds are placed in groups of five—an odd number that is indivisible—to symbolize the unity of husband and wife. In the Middle East, Jordan almonds are considered an aphrodisiac so there are always plenty on hand for the newlyweds and their guests.

Jordan almonds are thought to originate in ancient Rome, where honey-covered almonds were introduced by a Roman baker and confectioner named Julius Dragatus. His confections were called dragati and were served by nobility at weddings and births. When sugar became more readily available in the 15th century, the nuts were coated in sugar instead. In Sulmona, Italy, the technique of creating the dragée almonds was perfected by the Pelino family.

The term Jordan is most likely a corrupted version of the French word jardin, meaning "garden", hence, a cultivated rather than wild almond. However, others suggest the term referred to a variety of almonds originally grown along the Jordan River characterized by long, thin, slender, rather smooth kernels in thick, heavy shells.

Still others believe that Jordan is a corruption of the name of the town of Verdun in the northeast of France. In the 13th century, when the medieval crusaders brought sugar to Europe after their campaigns in the Holy Land, it was very valuable and considered medicinal. During that time, an apothecary in Verdun began coating other medicines with sugar (calling them dragées) to make them easier to take. The town of Verdun became very well known for its dragées de Verdun.

Panned chocolate 
Other chocolate dragées with multi-colored candy shells are M&M's. Initially designed to allow easy transport and consumption of chocolate for the U.S. military, they have evolved into a popular candy, but are also sold as decorative dragées in 25 different colors.

Easter 
In Portugal sugared almonds ('amêndoas de Páscoa') are the most traditional treat and gift rather than chocolate eggs; and entire aisles in supermarkets may be devoted to them in the run-up to Easter itself.

Medicinal dragées 
Used to increase tolerability of bitter medication or merely to compel consumption, medicated candies or sugar-coated pills can be referred to as dragées.

Metallic decorative balls 

Another form of dragée is a small sphere of sugar, in the Commonwealth often called a cachou, used primarily in the decoration of cookies, cakes, and other forms of bakery. These are produced in various sizes, typically  in diameter. This is larger than nonpareils and smaller than large pearl tapioca.

Silver dragées have long been used for both wedding and holiday food decoration. More recently, metallic gold, copper, rainbow colors (red, green, blue, etc.), and pearlescent colors have become available.

In most countries, including the United Kingdom and France, silver dragées are classified as food items.  However, since 1906, US regulations have prohibited the manufacture or sale of any food that uses any metal or mineral substance, including silver, as a food coloring, coating, or additive.  The U.S. Food and Drug Administration considers the silver and gold metallic-finish sugar dragées to be inedible, and they may be sold only when accompanied with a notice that they are to be used for decorative purposes only.  Almonds that have been coated the same way are not permitted at all.  Although the metallic-finish dragées can be purchased in 49 US states, they are no longer sold in California.

See also 
 Comfit
 Jawbreakers
 Jelly bean
 List of almond dishes
 Sprinkles
 Sugar plum
 Suikerboon

References

Sources 

 Dictionnaire de Français Larousse (1996). 
 Richardson, Tim (2002), Sweets: A History of Candy, Bloomsbury.

External links

French confectionery
Nut confections
Almond desserts
Cuisine of Abruzzo